The 1988–89 season was Colchester United's 47th season in their history and eighth consecutive season in fourth tier of English football, the Fourth Division. Alongside competing in the Fourth Division, the club also participated in the FA Cup, the League Cup and the Associate Members' Cup.

Roger Brown's unsuccessful tenure came to and end following a club record 8–0 defeat at Leyton Orient in October. With the club languishing bottom of the entire football league, former Rangers manager Jock Wallace boosted the club and helped them avoid relegation to the Conference, ending the season 22nd of 24 clubs.

Remarkably, Colchester had a successful FA Cup run as they saw off Fulham, Swansea City and Shrewsbury Town on their way to a fourth round tie with Sheffield United, who knocked out the U's following a Layer Road replay. They again reached the area quarter-final of the Associate Members' Cup where they were defeated by Hereford United, and a 5–0 thrashing at Northampton Town spelt an early exit from the League Cup.

Season overview
Following a club record 8–0 defeat at Leyton Orient on 15 October, Roger Brown was dismissed from his position as manager. With the club bottom of the entire Football League for the first time since 1972, Steve Foley once again stepped up as caretaker manager. Under Foley's stewardship, the U's embarked on a successful FA Cup run, where they defeated Third Division Fulham and Second Division Swansea City and Shrewsbury Town. However, Third Division Sheffield United won 2–0 in a replay at Layer Road to progress to the fifth round.

Just weeks after signing for the club for £35,000, Paul McGee was sold to Wimbledon for a club record fee of £150,000, representing a huge profit in a short period of time.

Incoming as Brown's replacement was former Rangers manager Jock Wallace, with England World Cup winner Alan Ball his assistant. The impact of Wallace's appointment was instantaneous, with crowds rising over 3,500 the town became gripped by his passion and desire to avoid relegation to the Conference.

On 29 April, the U's travelled to their closest rivals Darlington, a game which Colchester won 2–1 thanks to a Robert Scott goal. The win lifted Colchester off the bottom of the league table for the first time since Brown's departure, and two successive home wins against Halifax Town and Exeter City confirmed Colchester's Fourth Division status for another year.

Meanwhile, in the League Cup, Colchester suffered an early exit following a 0–0 draw at home to Northampton Town and then a 5–0 hammering at the County Ground in the return leg. In the Associate Members' Cup, Colchester won their two group stage games against Lincoln City and Southend United, before regaining some pride by beating Leyton Orient at Layer Road to progress to the area quarter-final. They were then beaten 1–0 by visitors Hereford United.

Players

Transfers

In

 Total spending:  ~ £55,000

Out

 Total incoming:  ~ £267,500

Loans in

Loans out

Match details

Fourth Division

Results round by round

League table

Matches

League Cup

FA Cup

Associate Members' Cup

(Q) Qualified for next round

Squad statistics

Appearances and goals

|-
!colspan="14"|Players who appeared for Colchester who left during the season

|}

Goalscorers

Disciplinary record

Clean sheets
Number of games goalkeepers kept a clean sheet.

Player debuts
Players making their first-team Colchester United debut in a fully competitive match.

See also
List of Colchester United F.C. seasons

References

General
Books

Websites

Specific

1988-89
English football clubs 1988–89 season
1988–89 Football League Fourth Division by team